Dardenne may refer to:
Ardennes-Verdun dynasty, or Maison Dardenne
Dardenne brothers, Belgian film directors
Sabine Dardenne, Belgian author
Jay Dardenne, lawyer and politician from Baton Rouge, Louisiana
Guy Dardenne, Belgian footballer
Dardenne Prairie, Missouri
Dardenne Township, St. Charles County, Missouri